Kinyongia tavetana (common names: Kilimanjaro two-horned chameleon, Dwarf Fischer's chameleon) is a chameleon in the genus Kinyongia. It is native to southern Kenya and northern Tanzania. Its type locality is Mount Kilimanjaro, but it is also known from Chyulu Hills and Mount Meru to the Pare Mountains. Until 2008, it was widely confused with K. fischeri, but the ranges of the two species do not overlap.

The species' length averages 9.5 inches, and it is usually brown, green and grey. Males have two "saw blade" flattened false horns, while the females lack these distinctive feature.

References

Kinyongia
Reptiles of Kenya
Reptiles of Tanzania
Reptiles described in 1891
Taxa named by Franz Steindachner